The Copa Rommel Fernández 2009 season (officially "XIII Copa Rommel Fernández ") started in January 2009.  "Copa Rommel Fernández" is Panama's national club football championship founded in 1996.

On 26 February 2009 Millenium was crowned champions after defeating El Tecal 5-4 after extra time. Due to the expansion of Primera A, both teams were promoted and will participate in the 2009 season. José Tobio was the top goal scorer in this 2009 season with 9 goals.

2009 teams

Zone 1
East Panamá, Colón and Darién

Zone 2
West Panamá and Coclé

Zone 3
Herrera, Los Santos and Veraguas

Zone 4
Bocas del Toro, Chiriquí and Occidental Chiriquí

Regular round

Zone 1
 Results from the 4 and 5 feature are unknown, however both SUNTRACS and Millenium qualified.

Green indicates teams qualified to the final round

Zone 2

Green indicates teams qualified to the final round

Zone 3

Green indicates teams qualified to the final round

Zone 4
 Results from the 4 and 5 feature are unknown, however both America and Majagua qualified.

Green indicates teams qualified to the final round

Final round

Quarterfinals

Millenium advances to final 4–1 on penalties

Semifinals

Final

Top goalscorer
9 goals
  José Tobio (Millenium)

Copa Rommel Fernández seasons
3